Erythrostemon mexicanus, formerly Caesalpinia mexicana, is a species of plant in the genus Erythrostemon, within the pea family, Fabaceae. Common names include Mexican holdback, Mexican caesalpinia, and tabachín del monte. It is native to the extreme lower Rio Grande Valley of Texas and to parts of Mexico: in the northeast and further south along the Gulf coast as well as the Pacific coast in Nayarit, Jalisco, Colima, and a small portion of Sinaloa.

Description
Leaves are bipinnately-compound and dark green. Each leaf has five to nine pinnae  in length. Yellow, slightly fragrant flowers are produced on  terminal spikes of 10 to 30. Blooming takes place from February to July, often continuing to October. The fruit is a dehiscent tan or yellow seedpod  in length.

Uses
Mexican holdback is cultivated as an ornamental because of its showy flowers, lush, fine-textured foliage, and drought tolerance.

Ecology
Erythrostemon mexicanus is the host plant for the caterpillars of the curve-winged metalmark (Emesis emesia).

References

External links

Caesalpinieae
Plants described in 1862
Flora of the Rio Grande valleys
Trees of Hidalgo (state)
Trees of Nuevo León
Trees of San Luis Potosí
Trees of Tamaulipas
Trees of Veracruz
Flora of the Sierra Madre Oriental
Trees of Nayarit
Trees of Jalisco
Trees of Colima